Hawarden is a village, community and electoral ward in Flintshire, Wales. It is part of the Deeside conurbation on the Wales-England border and is home to Hawarden Castle. In the 2011 census the ward of the same name had a population of 1,887, whereas the community of the same name, which also includes Ewloe (which also has a castle) Mancot and Aston had a population of 13,920.
The scenic wooded Hawarden Park abuts the clustered settlement in the south. Hawarden Bridge consists of distribution and industrial business premises beyond Shotton/Queensferry and the Dee. The west of the main street is called The Highway, its start marked by the crossroads with a fountain in the middle, near which are public houses, some with restaurants.

In 2014 it was named in The Sunday Times annual Best Places To Live List.

The highest temperature in Wales was recorded in Hawarden on 18 July 2022 at 37.1°C. The previous highest  temperature recorded in Wales, 35.2°C, was also recorded in Hawarden on 2 August 1990.  Hawarden has held this record almost continuously, until it was replaced for a few hours by Gogerddan which recorded a temperature of 35.3°C on 18 July 2022, first breaking the Welsh record, after which Hawarden surpassed Gogerddan.

Etymology 
Both the English and Welsh names of the village allude to its elevated geographical position. English   is from Old English  "high" +  'enclosure' and has had its bisyllabic pronunciation since the sixteenth century, its trisyllabic, now solely written, form being due to the influence of Welsh, which stresses and therefore kept the penultimate syllable.

History
The 1848 Topographical Dictionary of Wales led by Samuel Lewis states that Hawarden is of remote antiquity and was called 'Pennard Halawg', or more properly 'Pen-y-Llwch', the headland above the lake.  The hill forts such as the huge remains next to the medieval Hawarden Castle and Trueman's Hill motte were - it records locally - believed to date to the time of fortifications against incursions of the Cornavii tribe and the Romans.

The Normans recorded that the Saxons called the place Haordine where, east of today's village, was the principal manor of the Saxon Hundred of Atiscros. William the Conqueror granted the lands and manor to Hugh Lupus since it formed part of the County Palatine of Chester, whereupon Hawarden Castle was built and later proved key to Welsh history, at that time lived in by Roger Fitzvalerine, then the Montaults, or de Montaltos, barons of Mold, who held it as seneschal. 

Efforts to subdue north Welsh territory into a degree of fiefdom followed intermittently, with no great success.  In the castle Llewellyn of Wales who was in possession negotiated peace in 1264 with Simon de Montford, who led a brief rebellion against Henry III of England and agreed to betroth his daughter to Llewellyn in exchange for restoring the de facto Welsh castle to Robert de Montault.  The rebellion failed.  Accordingly, by 1280 the castle became a crown asset, listed as a Castrum Regis.  Later, following Edward's successful campaign imposing exacting terms on the Welsh, building Flint Castle and strengthening other castles, in 1282 Llewellyn's brother Dafydd took the castle back, killing the garrison and transferring Roger de Clifford to remote Snowdon.  This second recapture of the castle triggered Edward's killing of Llewellyn and annexation of Wales.  The castle became a prized possession: see Hawarden Castle.

The village of Saltney (next to Chester, but in Wales) was part of the parish.

19th century
The prime minister William Ewart Gladstone (1809–1898) spent his later life in Hawarden Castle, which had in the Glorious Revolution been acquired by his wife's family, the Glynne baronets.  In 1847 water was brought into the place at an expense of upwards of £1000 to be recouped by the River Dee Company.  In the nineteenth century the economy of the parish (about three times larger than the modern Community Council area) involved weekly markets, many seams of coal, the making of tiles, bricks and drainage pipes and chemicals such as Glauber salts and ivory black making.

In 1886 the curate of Hawarden, the Rev. Harry Drew, married Mary Gladstone, the second daughter of the Prime Minister, at St Margaret's Church, Westminster – a society wedding attended by the Prince of Wales.

Gladstone bequeathed his library to the town under the name of St Deiniol's Library in honour of the patron saint of the parish church next door. It is the only residential library in Britain and was renamed Gladstone's Library in 2010.

Education
Rector Drew Junior School, renamed in 2016 to Hawarden Village Church School is the junior school of the village. Hawarden High School is a high school which dates back to 1606 and was attended by Michael Owen (International footballer), but also Gary Speed, the former manager of the Wales national football team.

Economy
Queensferry consists predominantly of industrial, commercial and storage businesses by the River Dee and is situated to immediately northeast of the community - the village is residential. moneysupermarket.com has significant premises at St David's Park by the main A55 road in nearby Ewloe.

Hawarden Airport, sometimes called Hawarden (Chester) Airport, with adjoining Hawarden Industrial Park is in nearby Broughton.

Visitor attractions
Hawarden Castle
Old Hawarden Castle
Gladstone's Library

There are three pubs in Hawarden;  The 'Old Grocery', The 'Fox and Grapes' and The 'Glynne Arms' with The 'Crown And Liver' a near fourth.

Governance
At the lowest level of local government, Hawarden elects or co-opts twenty community councillors to Hawarden Community Council, from four community electoral divisions namely Aston, Ewloe, Hawarden and Mancot.

The four community wards (including Hawarden covering the village) also form four county wards for elections to Flintshire County Council. Hawarden ward elects one county councillor, while Aston, Ewloe and Mancot elect two county councillors each.

The county archives, the Flintshire Record Office, are housed in the Old Rectory at Hawarden.

Climate

Transport
Close towns include Connah's Quay , Mold , Flint  and the city of Wrexham .

Hawarden railway station is on the Borderlands line with services direct to Birkenhead to the north and to Wrexham to the south.

There are three interchanges with local roads onto the major A55 road linking North Wales to Chester and the major A494 road linking Dolgellau via Mold to the Wirral where it divides into the roads towards Liverpool and Manchester (the M53 and M56 motorways) - the village has a choice of three routes towards Chester city centre.

Notable residents

Sir John Glynne, 6th Baronet (1713–1777) politician and landowner, built Hawarden Castle.
Emma, Lady Hamilton (1765–1815), maid, model, dancer and actress; raised in Hawarden.
William Ewart Gladstone (1809–1898), 12 years as Prime Minister; retired to Hawarden Castle.
Edmund J. Baillie (1851–1897) businessman, horticulturalist and vegetarianism activist.
Mary Gladstone (1847–1927), daughter of the UK Prime Minister, William Ewart Gladstone; lived in Hawarden Castle from 1886
Maysie Chalmers (1894–1982), actress, electrical engineer and designer, leading figure in the Electrical Association for Women.
Air Marshal Sir John Rowlands (1915–2006), recipient of the George Cross for bomb disposal in WWII; later worked on nuclear weapons programme.
Nicholas Hunt (1930–2013), navy Rear-Admiral, father of Jeremy Hunt MP.
Barry Jones, Baron Jones (born 1938), politician, went to Hawarden Grammar School
Tony Millington (1943–2015) footballer, with over 350 club caps and 21 for Wales
Sasha (DJ), (born 1969), DJ and producer, real name Alexander Paul Coe
Michael Owen (born 1979), footballer with 326 club caps and 89 for England; went to school in Hawarden.

See also
Hawarden Castle
St Deiniol's Church, Hawarden
Hawarden Rangers F.C.
Hawarden Airport
Hawarden Manor House

Notes and references
Notes 

References

External links

 

Communities in Flintshire
Wards of Flintshire
Villages in Flintshire